Elk Island Public Schools Regional Division No. 14 or Elk Island Public Schools is a public school authority within the Canadian province of Alberta operated out of Sherwood Park.

See also 
List of school authorities in Alberta

References

External links 

 
School districts in Alberta
Sherwood Park